The Mystic massacrealso known as the Pequot massacre and the Battle of Mystic Forttook place on May 26, 1637, during the Pequot War, when Connecticut colonizers under Captain John Mason and their Narragansett and Mohegan allies set fire to the Pequot Fort near the Mystic River. They shot anyone who tried to escape the wooden palisade fortress and murdered most of the village.  There were between 400 and 700 Pequot civilians killed during the massacre, and the only Pequot survivors were warriors who were away in a raiding party with their sachem Sassacus.

Background
The Pequots were the dominant Native American tribe in the southeastern portion of Connecticut Colony, and they had long competed with the neighboring Mohegan and Narragansett tribes. The European colonists established trade with all three tribes, exchanging European goods for wampum and furs. The Pequots eventually allied with the Dutch colonists, while the Mohegans and others allied with the New England colonists.

A trader named John Oldham was murdered and his trading ship looted by Pequots, and retaliation raids ensued by Colonists and their Native American allies.  On April 23, 1637, 200 Pequot warriors attacked the colonial village of Wethersfield killing 6 men and 3 women, all noncombatants. This was a major turning point in the Pequot war as it enraged the settlers that the warriors would kill civilians and led to increased support for the Pequot War among colonists. According to Katherine Grandjean, the Great Colonial Hurricane of 1635 damaged the corn and other crop harvests of that year, making food supplies scarce and creating competition for winter food supplies.  This in turn increased the tensions between the Pequots and Colonists who were ill-prepared to face periods of famine.

Massacre

The Connecticut towns raised a Puritan militia commanded by Captain John Mason consisting of 90 men, plus 70 Mohegans under sachems Uncas and Wequash. Twenty more men under Captain John Underhill joined him from Fort Saybrook. At the same time, Pequot sachem Sassacus took a few hundred warriors and set out to make another raid on Hartford, Connecticut.

On route to the Pequot Fort, Captain Mason recruited more than 200 Narragansett and Niantic to join his force. On the night of May 26, 1637, the Colonial and Indian forces arrived at the fortified Pequot village, which was on a low hill near the Mystic River. The large village was surrounded by a palisade with only two exits. The Colonial forces first attempted a surprise attack but they withdrew after stiff resistance from the Pequot. 

In response, Mason ordered that the village should be set ablaze and its two exits blocked off. As the fire raged, many trapped Pequots were shot as they attempted to escape by climbing over the palisade; those men, women and children who did get out were killed by Narragansett fighters.  Captain John Underhill described the scene and his participation:
"Captaine Mason entring into a Wigwam, brought out a fire-brand, after he had wounded many in the house, then he set fire on the West-side where he entred, my selfe set fire on the South end with a traine of Powder, the fires of both meeting in the center of the Fort blazed most terribly, and burnt all in the space of halfe an houre; many couragious fellowes were unwilling to come out, and fought most desperately through the Palisadoes, so as they were scorched and burnt with the very flame, and were deprived of their armes, in regard the fire burnt their very bowstrings, and so perished valiantly: mercy they did deserve for their valour, could we have had opportunitie to have bestowed it; many were burnt in the Fort, both men, women, and children, others forced out, and came in troopes to the Indians, twentie, and thirtie at a time, which our souldiers received and entertained with the point of the sword; downe fell men, women, and children, those that scaped us, fell into the hands of the Indians, that were in the reere of us; it is reported by themselves, that there were about foure hundred soules in this Fort, and not above five of them escaped out of our hands."

Whooping Mohegans would collect the heads of fallen Pequots, scalps were taken as war trophies. Hundreds of Pequot were killed; the colonists reported that only five village occupants escaped while seven were taken prisoner. This was the first example of total war by colonists in the new world.

Returning Pequot warriors – who had been with their sachem Sassacus at the time of the attack – chased after the Colonial forces after discovering the massacre. But the Puritans managed to avoid any Pequot counterattack despite getting lost for a brief period during their retreat back to the Connecticut Colony.

Aftermath
Estimates of Pequot deaths range from 400 to 700, including women, children, and the elderly. The colonists suffered between 22 and 26 casualties with two confirmed dead. Approximately 40 Narragansett warriors were wounded as the colonists mistook many of them for Pequots. The massacre effectively broke the Pequots, and Sassacus and many of his followers were surrounded in a swamp near a Mattabesset village called Sasqua. The battle which followed is known as the "Fairfield Swamp Fight", in which nearly 180 warriors were killed, wounded, or captured. Sassacus escaped with about 80 of his men, but he was killed by the Mohawks, who sent his scalp to the colonists as a symbol of friendship.

The Pequot numbers were so diminished that they ceased to be a tribe in most senses. The treaty mandated that the remaining Pequots were to be absorbed into the Mohegan and Narragansett tribes, nor were they allowed to refer to themselves as Pequots.  In the latter half of the 20th century, Pequot descendants revived the tribe, achieving federal recognition in 1983 and settlement of some land claims.

Some 500–1000 (scholars differ) women and children were shipped into slavery in Bermuda and Barbados. Some 500 were taken to Barbados on the Sea Flower slave ship captained by John Gallop that mostly plied the African slave trade.

Modern reappraisals
During the emergence of the modern Pequot tribe in the 1990s, an article in The New England Quarterly considered arguments for and against whether the Mystic massacre should be considered an act of genocide. American author Dr Rebecca Joyce Frey lists the incident as genocide in her 2009 book Genocide and International Justice. As did US legal scholar Steven M. Wise, from Harvard Law School, who called the Mystic Massacre "the Puritans genocidal Indian War" where "one thousand Indians were [killed]". Wise notes that Captain John Underhill justified the killing of the elderly, women, children, and the infirm by stating that "sometimes the Scripture declareth women and children must perish with their parents [...] We had sufficient light from the Word of God for our proceedings."

In 2020, a statue of Captain John Mason at Palisado Green in Windsor, Connecticut (along with a similar statue of Christopher Columbus in the same area) was subject to calls for its removal following in the wake of national civil rights protests about Confederate statues. The statue, which was originally erected on the site of the Mystic Massacre in 1889, was moved to Windsor in 1996 because it was the location of Mason's home. In September 2020, the town council voted 5-4 to remove statue and give it to Windsor Historical Society. But Dr. Kevin McBride, Director of Research at the Pequot Museum noted that when it was removed from its original location of the Mystic Massacre in the 1990s, the Pequot's tribal chairman Skip Hayward was against its removal because "If you take it down," he said, "no one will remember what happened here."

In early 2021, calls were made to remove another statue depicting Captain John Mason that stands outside the Connecticut State Capitol in Hartford. After a year of deliberations, a state commission decided that the statue should be removed but lawmakers from the Connecticut General Assembly would be permitted to debate its future.

The Mystic massacre was featured in the History Channel series 10 Days That Unexpectedly Changed America.

See also

Robert Seeley

References

Further reading
 Cave, Alfred A. "Who Killed John Stone? A Note on the Origins of the Pequot War", The William and Mary Quarterly, 3rd Ser., Vol.49, No.3 (Jul. 1992), pp. 509–521

External links
 Newes from America Or, A New and Experimentall Discoverie of New England; Containing, A Trve Relation of Their War-like Proceedings These Two Yeares Last Past, with a Figure of the Indian Fort, or Palizado, by John Underhill Captain of Militia, Massachusetts Bay Colony Paul Royster , editor, University of Nebraska-Lincoln

1637 in the Thirteen Colonies
Massacres in the Thirteen Colonies
Massacres of Native Americans
Mystic, Connecticut
Groton, Connecticut
Massacres by Native Americans
New London County, Connecticut
Pre-statehood history of Connecticut
Military history of the Thirteen Colonies
Pequot War
Battles in Connecticut
Native American genocide
Massacres in 1637